General elections were held in Jamaica on 30 October 1980. The balance of power in the 60-seat Jamaican House of Representatives was dramatically-shifted.  Prior to the vote, the People's National Party (PNP), led by Prime Minister Michael Manley, had a 47 to 13 majority over the Jamaica Labour Party (JLP), led by Edward Seaga.  With the loss by 38 PNP incumbents to their JLP challengers, Seaga's party captured a 51 to 9 majority and Seaga replaced Manley as Prime Minister of Jamaica.  Voter turnout was 86.9%.

Conduct
The elections were marked by gun violence, exacerbated by economic pressure related to IMF austerity, lay-offs of public workers, and blackouts due to a national electric strike. 153 elderly women died in the Eventide Home fire on 20 May, which was suspected, but not proven, to have been started by politically-motivated arsonists.

Results

References

1980 in Jamaica
Elections in Jamaica
Jamaica